Canyon Lake is one of four reservoirs that were formed by the damming of the Salt River in the U.S. state of Arizona as part of the Salt River Project. It was formed by the Mormon Flat Dam, which was completed in 1925 after two years of construction. Two others, Apache Lake and Roosevelt Lake, are upstream. The fourth, Saguaro Lake, is downstream.

It is within the Superstition Wilderness of Tonto National Forest and is a popular recreation area for the Phoenix metropolitan area. Recreation amenities include hiking trails, camping, and boating, all managed by the United States Forest Service. Canyon Lake is a popular stop along the Apache Trail (Arizona State Route 88) from Apache Junction, Arizona, passing Tortilla Flat, Arizona, before reaching Apache Lake and Roosevelt Lake behind Theodore Roosevelt Dam.

In 2022, a fish kill caused by golden algae affected 100,000 fish.

Fish species
 Rainbow Trout
 Largemouth Bass
 Smallmouth Bass
 Yellow Bass
 Crappie
 Sunfish
 Catfish (Channel)
 Walleye
 Carp

Gallery

References

External links

 
 Canyon Lake Marina Website
 Daily Water Level report from SRP
 Arizona Boating Locations Facilities Map
 Arizona Fishing Locations Map
 Video of Canyon Lake, Arizona

Reservoirs in Maricopa County, Arizona
Tonto National Forest
Reservoirs in Arizona